"Rock Bottom" was the  entry in the Eurovision Song Contest 1977, performed in English by Lynsey de Paul and Mike Moran. It was also written and produced by de Paul and Moran and released on the Polydor record label. Originally it was written for the group Blue Mink; and submitted unbeknown to de Paul and Moran as an entry for A Song For Europe by the publishers and when it was selected, de Paul agreed to perform the song if Moran would join her. On 9 March 1977, "Rock Bottom" was selected to represent the UK at the A Song for Europe 1977 event held at the New London Theatre, presented by Terry Wogan.

History
The jaunty sing-a-long song says that when people are in a bad situation they should work to solve problems and not be pessimistic about tragedies. Apparently it represented  the situation at the time; Eurovision 1977 was almost cancelled due to budget restrictions and it was delayed by five weeks due to a strike by cameramen and technicians. The BBC, who had to host the contest that year, did not give the song its whole-hearted support because it was the favourite to win the contest and, if it had won, then they would have to finance and host the 1978 contest, inspiring the plot used in the movie Eurovision Song Contest: The Story of Fire Saga. Eurovision: Secrets & Scandals, a one hour long Channel 5 documentary, shown on 13 May 2022, also confirmed that the BBC was secretly relieved that "Rock Bottom" did not win because they definitely did not want to host the 1978 contest.

The song contest was planned to take place on 2 April due to the cameramen and technicians being on strike, but it was rescheduled and finally took place on 7 May. The song was performed ninth on the night, following 's Os Amigos with "Portugal no coração" and preceding 's Pascalis, Marianna, Robert & Bessy with "Mathima Solfege". At the close of voting, it had received 121 points, placing second in a field of 18 entries. Lionel Blair choreographed de Paul and Moran's piano seated performance, as he had done for the programme deciding the UK's entry that year. In an interview with Gala magazine, Marie Myriam, the contest winner stated that she loved "Rock Bottom".

It was preceded by "Save Your Kisses for Me" by Brotherhood of Man as the British representative at the 1976 Eurovision Song Contest and succeeded by Co-Co with "Bad Old Days" in 1978. De Paul was the last established and well-known international artist to enter the contest for the UK, until Scott Fitzgerald in 1988, and she was the first British entry to write and perform her own song.

"Rock Bottom" charted in several European countries, topping the charts in Switzerland, no. 2 in Austria, no. 4 in Germany, no. 4 in Portugal, no. 6 in Sweden (no. 4 on the Poporama chart), no. 7 in Ireland and Norway, no.8 in Belgium and no. 10 in France and Israel. In the UK Singles Chart, it reached no. 19 but on the UK Juke Box Top 20 it reached no. 8. It also made no. 7 on the Europarade chart, no. 13 on the Radio Luxembourg Top 30. On the basis of sales from the record-buying public of Europe, it was the winning entry, outperforming the contest's winner, a quarter of a million copies being sold in Germany alone, where it was the 38th best selling single of 1977. After the Eurovision Song Contest, it was released as one of the tracks on an EP in Portugal entitled "Conjunto Pentagrama" ("Pentogram Set"), together with the French entry "L'Oiseau Et L'Enfant", the Irish entry "It's Nice To Be In Love Again" and the Monaco entry "Une Petite Française".

In a ranking by The Daily Telegraph of all of the UK's Eurovision Song Contest entries over the last 59 years, "Rock Bottom" came in at no. 9 and a year later they wrote "Not just a fun, honky-tonk tune, but also a rather memorable performance. Moran and de Paul were dressed in fetching Edwardian morning-suits, sat back-to-back playing a pair of duelling grand pianos." In an analysis of all Eurovision Song Contest songs that entered the German singles chart, it was ranked number 20, based on number of weeks on the chart and chart positions achieved. In 2021, PRS for Music revealed a top 20 of most played UK Eurovision entries and "Rock Bottom" was number 13.

The duo also recorded a German version of "Rock Bottom" called "Für Immer" with German lyrics by Marianne Rebesky, which also had healthy sales figures in German speaking countries, and this version was covered by the band Wir. De Paul and Moran's version of "Für Immer" appeared on the CD Greatest Hits - Lynsey de Paul. Instrumental versions of the song also appeared on James Last's album Auf Last Geht's Los. Other versions have been recorded by the Studio Group, Armi & Danny (Danny (Finnish singer), Jörgen Petersenin Orkesteri, Ted Weber, Brothers Of The World, Leni, Günter Noris, Inger Lise (Inger Lise Rypdal) & Stein (Stein Ingebrigtsen), Daniel Janin, Annette Klingenberg & Johnny Reimar, Bingos, and The Hiltonaires and, most recently by jazz guitarist Denny Wright.

The song has featured on Eurovision compilation albums such as This Is... Eurovision, Ultimate Eurovision Party!, Favoriet Van Follet - 18 Unieke Eurovisiesongs (18 unique Eurovision songs) and Stars Of Eurovision, as well as a number of de Paul's compilation CDs. It was also a track on the CD double album Die Ultimative Chart Show - Die erfolgreichsten Piano-Hits aller Zeiten in 2010, which made the Swiss and Austrian albums charts. In 2018, the song was one of 16 songs chosen as 1970s Eurovision classics on a specially released vinyl album that also featured ABBA, Brotherhood Of Man, Baccara, The New Seekers, Anne-Marie David and Gigliola Cinquetti. It was also included as a track on the 2021 album, Now That's What I Call Eurovision, which reached number one on the UK Official Compilations Chart.

Charts

Weekly charts

Year-end charts

References

Eurovision songs of the United Kingdom
Eurovision songs of 1977
1977 songs
Songs written by Lynsey de Paul
Lynsey de Paul songs
Number-one singles in Switzerland
Songs written by Michael Moran (music producer)
Polydor Records singles
1977 singles